Châtillon-la-Palud is a commune in the Ain department in eastern France.

Geography
The commune is located in the Dombes. It lies on the right bank of the Ain, which flows south through the commune's eastern part. The Albarine flows into the Ain in the southeastern part of the commune.

Population

See also
Communes of the Ain department
Dombes

References

External links

Dombes and the city of Chatillon_la_Palud

Communes of Ain
Ain communes articles needing translation from French Wikipedia